Thomas Llewellyn "Red" Owens (November 1, 1874 – August 20, 1952) was a professional baseball player. He played parts of two seasons in Major League Baseball for the 1899 Philadelphia Phillies and 1905 Brooklyn Superbas, primarily as a second baseman. His minor league baseball career spanned 19 seasons, from 1896 until 1914.

External links

Major League Baseball second basemen
Brooklyn Superbas players
Philadelphia Phillies players
Milton (minor league baseball) players
Shamokin (minor league baseball) players
Williamsport Demorest Bicycle Boys players
Shamokin Coal Heavers players
Lockhaven Maroons players
Shamokin Reds players
Bloomsburg Blue Jays players
New Haven Blues players
Norwich Witches players
Bristol Bellmakers players
Bristol Bell Makers players
Toledo Mud Hens players
Springfield Ponies players
Shreveport Pirates (baseball) players
Rochester Bronchos players
York Penn Parks players
York White Rozes players
Reading Pretzels players
Trenton Tigers players
Wilmington Peaches players
Harrisburg Senators players
Quincy Vets players
Anderson Electricians players
Durham Bulls players
Charlotte Hornets (baseball) players
Minor league baseball managers
19th-century baseball players
1874 births
1952 deaths
Baseball players from Pennsylvania
Sportspeople from Pottsville, Pennsylvania